Daniel Lopatin is a Brooklyn-based experimental musician who records primarily under the pseudonym Oneohtrix Point Never. Early in his career as both a solo artist and as a member of several groups, he released a number of LPs and extended plays on a variety of independent labels. In 2010, he signed to Editions Mego and released his major label debut Returnal. In 2011, he founded the record label Software. In 2013, Lopatin signed to British electronic label Warp Records and released his label debut R Plus Seven.

As Oneohtrix Point Never

Studio albums

Extended plays and cassettes
 Transmat Memories (2008, Taped Sounds)
 A Pact Between Strangers (2008, Gneiss Things)
 Hollyr (2008, Sound Holes)
 Ruined Lives (2008, Young Tapes)
 Heart of a Champion (2008, Mistake By The Lake Tapes)
 KGB Nights/Blue Drive (credited to KGB Man/Oneohtrix Point Never) (2009, Catholic Tapes)
 Young Beidnahga (2009, Ruralfaune)
 Caboladies/Oneohtrix Point Never Split (2009, NNA Tapes)
 Scenes with Curved Objects (2009, Utmarken)
 Dog in the Fog (2012, Software)
 Commissions I (2014, Warp)
 Commissions II (2015, Warp)
 The Station (2018, Warp)
 Love in the Time of Lexapro (2018, Warp)

Singles
 "Sleep Dealer" (2011, Software)
 "Replica" (2011, Software)
 "Still Life" (2013, Warp)
 "Problem Areas" (2013, Warp)
 "Zebra" (2013, Warp)
 "Sticky Drama" (2015, Warp)
 "I Bite Through It" (2015, Warp)
 "Mutant Standard" (2015, Warp)
 "The Pure and the Damned" (2017, Warp)
 "Black Snow" (2018, Warp)
 "We'll Take It" (2018, Warp)
 "The Station" (2018, Warp)

Compilation albums
 Rifts 2-CD (2009, No Fun); 3-CD (2012, Software)
 Drawn and Quartered (2013, Software)
 The Fall into Time (2013, Software)

Soundtrack albums
 Good Time (2017, Warp)
 Uncut Gems (2019, Warp)

Miscellaneous

 Music for Reliquary House / In 1980 I Was a Blue Square (split LP with Rene Hell) (2010, NNA Tapes)

Production and mixing work

 Antony and the Johnsons – Swanlights (EP), 2010 (Producer on "Swanlights OPN Edit")
 Nine Inch Nails – Hesitation Marks, 2013 ("Find My Way" remix on deluxe edition)
 Pariah – IOTDXI (compilation), 2011 (Producer on "Orpheus" (Oneohtrix Point Never Subliminal Cops Edit))
 ANOHNI – Hopelessness, 2016 (Co-production with Anohni and Hudson Mohawke)
 DJ Earl – Open Your Eyes, 2016 (Co-production, keyboards)
 ANOHNI – Paradise (EP), 2017 (Co-production with Anohni and Hudson Mohawke)
 FKA twigs – MAGDALENE, 2019 (Producer on "daybed")
 The Weeknd – After Hours, 2020 (Co-production, keyboards, "Save Your Tears" remix on deluxe edition)
The Weeknd – Dawn FM, 2022 (Co-production)
Charli XCX – CRASH, 2022 (Co-production on "Every Rule" with A. G. Cook)
Soccer Mommy – Sometimes, Forever, 2022

Video

 Memory Vague (2009, Root Strata)

As Daniel Lopatin

Collaborations

 Instrumental Tourist (collaboration with Tim Hecker) (2011, Software)

Film score

 The Bling Ring (2013)
 Partisan (2015)
 Uncut Gems (Original Motion Picture Soundtrack) (2019)

Musical contributions

 Ducktails – The Flower Lane (2013) (Synthesizer)
 Real Estate – "Out of Tune" from Days (2011) (Synthesizer)
 Moses Sumney - Græ (2020) (Synthesizer, Additional Production)

Production and mixing work

 Autre Ne Veut – ‘Anxiety’, 2013 (Additional Production, Keyboards)
 Ducktails – ‘The Flower Lane’, 2013 (Synthesizer)
 Okkyung Lee, Lasse Marhaug, C. Spencer Yeh – ‘Wake Up Awesome’, 2013 (Executive Producer – as Daniel Lopatin)
 Clinic – ‘Free Reign’, 2012 (Mixing)
 Harold Grosskopf – ‘Re-Synthesist’, 2011 (feature on ‘Trauma 2010)

As Chuck Person

Cassette

 Chuck Person's Eccojams Vol. 1 (as Chuck Person) (2010, The Curatorial Club)

Compilations

 A.D.D. Complete (2012, Software)

As Dania Shapes

Studio albums

Soundsystem Pastoral (2006, Naivsuper)
Holograd (2008, Paper Cities)

As a member of Ford & Lopatin/Games

Studio albums

Channel Pressure (2011, Software)

Extended plays

Everything Is Working (2010, Hippos in Tanks)
That We Can Play (2010, Hippos in Tanks)

Mixtapes
Spend the Night with... Games (2010)

Other projects

As a member of Infinity Window

Trans Fat (2008, Chocolate Monk)
Artificial Midnight (2009, Arbor)

As a member of Skyramps

Days of Thunder (2009, Wagon)

As a member of Total System Point Never

Power in That Which Compels You (2008, Snapped in Half)

As a member of Astronaut

Early Peril (2008, Insult)
Sans Noise Suitcase (2008, Housecraft)

As a member of Guys Next Door
"Behind the Wall" (2017, PC Music)

References

Discographies of American artists
Daniel Lopatin